Moira Demos is an Emmy Award winning American filmmaker, producer and editor. Demos rose to prominence with her documentary Making a Murderer which she co-directed with filmmaker Laura Ricciardi, in a process that took 10 years to complete.

Film career
Before working as a director Demos worked frequently as a film editor and an electrician on the set of films. She is credited as an electrician for the film Pollock based on painter Jackson Pollock's life, and is also credited as an additional electrician on the film You Can Count on Me.

Making a Murderer
In 2005 Demos and Laura Ricciardi read the article "Freed by DNA, Now Charged in New Crime" in The New York Times. Fascinated by Steven Avery's case, they rented a car and borrowed a camera and began filming the day after they arrived in Wisconsin.

The series premiered on Netflix in December 2015 to positive reviews. Review aggregator site Metacritic awarded it a score of 85 out of 100, indicating majority positive reviews.

Demos went on to win four Emmys for her work on Making a Murderer: Outstanding Documentary or Nonfiction Series, Outstanding Directing For Nonfiction Programming, and Outstanding Writing for Nonfiction Programming which she shared with Ricciardi and the Emmy for Outstanding Picture Editing For Nonfiction Programming which she won on her own.

In 2018 Demos and Ricciardi released a second season of Making a Murderer.

Personal life
Demos is in a long-term relationship with director Laura Ricciardi. She graduated from Columbia University in 1996.

References

External links
 
 

American documentary filmmakers
LGBT film directors
American film editors
Living people
American women film editors
American women documentary filmmakers
Year of birth missing (living people)
Columbia College (New York) alumni
21st-century American women